Territornis is a genus of bird in the family Meliphagidae. 
It contains the following species:
 White-lined honeyeater (Territornis albilineata)
 Kimberley honeyeater (Territornis fordiana)
 Streak-breasted honeyeater (Territornis reticulata)

References

 
Bird genera